A sequestrum (plural: sequestra) is a piece of dead bone that has become separated during the process of necrosis from normal or sound bone.

It is a complication (sequela) of osteomyelitis. The pathological process is as follows:
 infection in the bone leads to an increase in intramedullary pressure due to inflammatory exudates
 the periosteum becomes stripped from the ostium, leading to vascular thrombosis
 bone necrosis follows due to lack of blood supply
 sequestra are formed

The sequestra are surrounded by sclerotic bone which is relatively avascular (without a blood supply). Within the bone itself, the haversian canals become blocked with scar tissue, and the bone becomes surrounded by thickened periosteum.

Due to the avascular nature of this bone, antibiotics which travel to sites of infection via the bloodstream poorly penetrate these tissues, hence the difficulty in treating chronic osteomyelitis.

At the same time as this, new bone is forming (known as involucrum). Openings in this involucrum allow debris and exudates (including pus) to pass from the sequestrum via sinus tracts to the skin.

Rarely, a sequestrum may turn out to be an osteoid osteoma, a rare tumor of the bone.

References

Bone fractures
Gross pathology